Dorcadion maradense is a species of beetle in the family Cerambycidae. It was described by Holzschuh in 2007. It is known from Iran.

References

maradense
Beetles described in 2007